Dr. Bani Yadav (born 7 September 1971) is an Indian rally driver, motorsports promoter and social rights supporter. Bani won the National Autocross Champion for 2019 and 2018 - Ladies. Bani was the only woman in India to win most of the major Cross Country Rally Titles in the woman's category held in India as well as the first woman to come an Overall second in the IRC - Rally De North - 2016. She was the first woman to receive the FMSCI - Outstanding Woman in Motorsports Award for rallying for the year 2016.The 1st Indian Woman to drive a Formula 4 car on the Yas Marina track in Abu Dhabi. She was awarded the Best Sportsperson Award for 2017 by Haryana State Government on the 69th Republic Day of India. She has been awarded the Woman Achiever Award by CII - IWN.

Early life and career
She was born in Lucknow and later brought up in Delhi. She did her schooling from Army Public School, Dhaula Kuan, Delhi and holds a degree in Bachelors of Geography from University of Delhi and a diploma in Advertising and Public Relations. She had her very first experience on the wheels at a tender age of 13 and that was the moment she knew she wanted to have a career in racing. Despite the several pull downs in her life she never gave up on her dreams. At the age of 43 years, for the first time in Jaipur Speed Sprint in 2013 she finally started off with her racing career and ended at 2nd position in the event.

Bani is the National Autocross Champion-Woman for two years in a row 2018 and 2019. She is the first woman from India to officially drive formula 4 cars outside of India at Abu Dhabi Yas Marina Circuit. She is the only woman in India to have been awarded a doctorate in Motorsports.

Bani got into Motorsport racing in the year 2013 and is the winner of multiple track events and cross country rallies in both men and women categories and only woman in India to have won major cross country rally titles. She has been doing various formats of rallies including Auto Cross Races, Cross Country Extreme Rallies, Time Speed Distance events, INRC and IRC rallies, Gymkhana. She was declared as the fastest woman driver in IRC Asia Pacific cup in the year 2015. Bani is an active participant in women empowerment events, she is an active endorser of equal rights and gender equality. She is associated with multiple NGOs focusing on cruelty against animals and women and is actively working for the cause. She helps to foster animals at her home till they can be adopted by willing families.

The toughest time of her life was when she got spine injury in October 2013. She went through two back surgeries. Minor surgery was in October, and then major one was in December. It took her 6 months to get back to her feet. As soon as she recovered she got back on the track.

Family background
She is married to her school friend Suresh and has two sons, who have also grown up to be speed-racers.

Career results

Achievements

National Autocross Champion India 2018 | 2019 - Ladies

1st woman to win second position in Rally De North part of Indian Rally

1st woman to have won – The Asia pacific rally Cup of Coffee Day Rally - Indian Rally championship women's category in 2015.

1st in Class 2000cc - The Asia pacific rally cup of Coffee Day Rally - Indian Rally championship.

4th in ASIA Pacific Rally Cup rally.

3rd 1650cc category in the Maruti Suzuki National Autocross championship 2016

1st woman from India to officially drive formula 4 car outside of India at the Abu Dhabi Yas Marina Circuit and tested the PS 4 sports tyres for Michelin.

Only Indian Woman to be awarded with an International Doctorate in MotorSports in India ( Management by the CommonWealth Vocational University of Tonga )

Awarded the Haryana State Government “ Best Sportsperson Award for 2017 -18

Awarded  "The TOPMOST Woman Rallyist OF The Year" Award for 2016 -17 ( International Association of Educators for World Peace - Affiliated to United Nations  )

Awarded The Outstanding Woman in Motorsports for Rallying for 2016, by FMSCI.

Awarded the Nirbhaya Jyoti National Woman Achiever Award 2018

Awarded the Main Hoon Beti Award 2018 by the Uttar Pradesh administration

Facilitated By the Ambassador of Argentine Republic His Excellency Mr Daniel Chuburu for contribution towards Motorsports

Awarded by the Confederation of Indian Industries the CII  – IWN Woman Achiever Award 2017.

Felicitated by The Ramraj Environment for outstanding contribution towards women Empowerment on Good Governance Day

Awarded the Top Woman Achiever Award by Bharti Airtel Ltd. in 2017.

Awarded with the Woman's Achievers Award by Amity University for the Year 2016.

Recognised as One of the Top 4 Woman Achievers on the eve of 70th year of India's Independence by Doordarshan in 2017.

TEDx Speaker

IRC Asia Cup

Raid De Himalaya

Desert Storm

Dakshin Dare

Royal Rajasthan Rally

Ultimate Desert Challenge

Rally Cross

Speed Sprints

Auto Cross Delhi

Solo Challenge

References

External links

https://instagram.com/drbaniyadavofficial?r=nametag

1971 births
Indian rally drivers
Indian racing drivers
Living people
Indian women's rights activists
Indian women activists
Activists from Delhi